White Bear 70 is an Indian reserve of the White Bear First Nations in Saskatchewan. It is 13 kilometres north of Carlyle and encompasses a total of 12,038.4 hectares. In the 2016 Canadian Census, it recorded a population of 691 living in 237 of its 972 total private dwellings. In the same year, its Community Well-Being index was calculated at 60 of 100, compared to 58.4 for the average First Nations community and 77.5 for the average non-Indigenous community.

The White Bear First Nations signed on to Treaty 4 in 1875 and in 1877 White Bear 70 was established on the east side of Moose Mountain Upland. In the late 1970s, Carlyle Lake Resort became part of the reserve. Since then, several economic developments have occurred on the reserve, such as the opening of White Bear Golf Course, Bear Claw Casino & Hotel, and the founding of White Bear Oil and Gas, Ltd.

See also
Pheasant Rump Nakota First Nation
Ocean Man First Nation

References

Indian reserves in Saskatchewan
Division No. 1, Saskatchewan
White Bear First Nations